"54-46 (That's My Number)" is a song by Fred "Toots" Hibbert, recorded by Toots and the Maytals, originally released on the Beverley's label in Jamaica and the Pyramid label in the UK. A follow-up version released a year later, "54-46 Was My Number", was one of the first reggae songs to receive widespread popularity outside Jamaica, and is seen as being one of the defining songs of the genre. It has been anthologised repeatedly and the titles of several reggae anthologies include "54-46" in their title.

The lyrics describe Toots' time in prison after being arrested for possession of marijuana. The song features a similar riddim to "Train to Skaville" by Toots and the Maytals' contemporaries, The Ethiopians.

In popular culture
The song was covered and released as a single in 1984 by British reggae band Aswad.  This single also featured on their 1984 album Rebel Souls. The song was also covered by dancehall star Yellowman in his song "Nobody Move, Nobody Get Hurt". It was later covered on Long Beach, CA-based 1990s ska-punk band Sublime's 1992 album 40 Oz. to Freedom in a medley with Sublime original "Ball and Chain", as well as Buju Banton on his album Inna Heights and Fermín Muguruza in his album Brigadistak Sound System. The ska legend Byron Lee & the Dragonaires covered the song on their 2002 album Shanty Town.  An instrumental version of the song can also be found on the album Below the Bassline by Ernest Ranglin. The Venetian ska band Ska-J recorded an Italian/Venetian-language cover with Venetian-themed lyrics entitled Santamarta.

The introduction of the song was sampled on Foxy Brown's single, "Oh Yeah", released from her third album, Broken Silence.

The bass line to the song forms the basis of the 1989 hit "Street Tuff" by Rebel MC & Double Trouble, and "The Bridge is Over" by KRS-One.

Part of the song was used on the soundtrack to the 2006 film This Is England and since, re-recorded by Kiko Bun for the television series.

The song was re-recorded for their album True Love, and is played along with Jeff Beck.

The song was covered and recorded by Fighting Gravity, a band with ska roots from Richmond, Virginia. It was also covered by Earl Stevenson (a contestant on Canadian Idol Season 6), on his first solo release Ghost (2010).

The punk rock band The Clash paid tribute to the Maytals with their song "Jail Guitar Doors" recorded in 1978. On the Live at the Lyceum version it ends with Joe Strummer singing "54-46 was my number, Right now someone else has that number".

It was also covered by Vanilla Ice on his 2011 album, W.T.F. (Wisdom, Tenacity and Focus).

The song appears in the sci-fi film Repo Men and in the series Narcos: Mexico.

On November 29, 2016, Major Lazer and Bad Royale released “My Number”, a track that samples “54-46 That’s My Number” which Pitchfork describes as, “a genre-defining classic from legendary ska/reggae group Toots and the Maytals.”  This release contains newly recorded vocals from frontman Toots Hibbert specifically designed for Major Lazer, changing the original lyrics to incorporate the group into the song while keeping the original melody.

References

External links
 Complete lyrics

1968 songs
1968 singles
Toots and the Maytals songs
Sublime (band) songs
Song recordings produced by Leslie Kong
Songs written by Toots Hibbert
Songs about prison
Songs about cannabis